Peter Alfred Laframboise (January 18, 1950 – March 19, 2011) was a Canadian professional ice hockey player. Laframboise played for the National Hockey League (NHL) California Golden Seals, Pittsburgh Penguins and Washington Capitals in the 1970s.  He also played for the Edmonton Oilers in the World Hockey Association.

Playing career
Born in Ottawa, Ontario, Laframboise played junior hockey for the Oshawa Generals and Ottawa 67's. He was selected by the California Golden Seals in the 1970 NHL Entry Draft, and joined the Providence Reds for the 1970-71 season. He moved to the Baltimore Clippers in the 1971-72 season, and made his NHL debut that season with the Seals. He played three seasons with the Golden Seals. He joined the Capitals for the 1974-75 season and was traded to Pittsburgh. The next season, he played for the Hershey Bears and did not play in the NHL again.  He played two seasons with the Springfield Indians with a call-up to the Edmonton Oilers, then of the WHA, before a final season in 1978-79 with the Binghamton Dusters.

Personal
After his playing career was over, Laframboise returned to Ottawa, where he founded the direct mailing firm Rideau Mailing Services in 1988. Laframboise died at his home in Ottawa. Laframboise is survived by his companion Cathy Leblanc and two sons, Jamie and Josh.

Career statistics

Regular season and playoffs

Transactions
 Selected by Los Angeles Sharks in 1972 WHA General Player Draft, February 12, 1972.
 Claimed by Washington from California in Expansion Draft, June 12, 1974.
 Traded to Pittsburgh by Washington for Ron Jones, January 21, 1975.
 Signed as a free agent by Edmonton (WHA) after LA Sharks (WHA) franchise folded, May 1975.
 Traded to Birmingham Bulls (WHA) by Edmonton (WHA) with Dan Arndt and Chris Evans for Lou Nistico and Jeff Jacques, September 1977.

Source: Legends of hockey

References

External links

Profile at hockeydraftcentral.com

1950 births
2011 deaths
Baltimore Clippers players
Binghamton Dusters players
California Golden Seals draft picks
California Golden Seals players
Canadian ice hockey left wingers
Edmonton Oilers (WHA) players
Hershey Bears players
Ice hockey people from Ottawa
Oshawa Generals players
Ottawa 67's players
Pittsburgh Penguins players
Providence Reds players
Springfield Indians players
Washington Capitals players